Earl Van Meter Long (July 11, 1885 – January 28, 1941) was an American college football coach. His career record was 7–17–1.

Early life and family
Long was born on July 11, 1885, in Maroa, Illinois, to Silaws and Mary Jane Long. He married Jessie Lois Brown, of Canton, Illinois, on July 10, 1911. He attended Harvard University, where was a two-sport letter winner in football and baseball.

Coaching career

Richmond
Long was the 17th head football coach at the University of Richmond and he held that position for the 1910 season. His coaching record at Richmond was 2–5–1.

Fairmount
After leaving Richmond, Long was named the eighth head football coach at Fairmount College—now known as Wichita State University—and he held that position for two seasons, from 1912 until 1913.  His coaching record at Fairmount was 6–11.

Head coaching record

References

External links
 

1885 births
1941 deaths
Basketball coaches from Illinois
Harvard Crimson football players
People from Macon County, Illinois
Richmond Spiders football coaches
Wichita State Shockers baseball coaches
Wichita State Shockers football coaches
Wichita State Shockers men's basketball coaches